The Hindi–Urdu controversy arose in 19th century colonial India out of the debate over whether the Hindi or Urdu language should be chosen as a national language.

Hindi and Urdu are mutually intelligible as spoken languages, to the extent that they are sometimes considered to be dialects or registers of a single spoken language referred to as Hindi-Urdu or sometimes Hindustani. The respective writing systems used to write the languages, however, are different: Hindi is written using Devanagari, whereas Urdu is written using a modified version of the Arabic script, each of which is completely illegible to readers literate only in the other.

Both Modern Standard Hindi and Urdu are literary forms of the Dehlavi dialect of Hindustani. A Persianized variant of Hindustani began to take shape during the Delhi Sultanate (1206–1526 AD) and Mughal Empire (1526–1858 AD) in South Asia. Known as Deccani in southern India, and by names such as Hindi, Hindavi, and Hindustani in northern India and elsewhere, it emerged as a lingua franca across much of India and was written in several scripts including Perso-Arabic, Devanagari, Kaithi, and Gurmukhi.

The Perso-Arabic script form of this language underwent a standardization process and further Persianization in the late Mughal period (18th century) and came to be known as Urdu, a name derived from the Turkic word ordu (army) or orda and is said to have arisen as the "language of the camp", or "Zaban-i-Ordu", or in the local "Lashkari Zaban". As a literary language, Urdu took shape in courtly, elite settings. Along with English, it became the official language of northern parts of British India in 1837.

Hindi as a standardized literary register of the Delhi dialect arose in the 19th century; the Braj dialect was the dominant literary language in the Devanagari script up until and through the nineteenth century. Efforts by Hindi movements to promote a Devanagari version of the Delhi dialect under the name of Hindi gained pace around 1880 as an effort to displace Urdu's official position.

The last few decades of the nineteenth century witnessed the eruption of the Hindi–Urdu controversy in the United Provinces (present-day Uttar Pradesh, then known as "the North-Western Provinces and Oudh"). The controversy comprised "Hindi" and "Urdu" protagonists each advocating the official use of Hindustani with the Devanagari script or with the Nastaʿlīq script, respectively. Hindi movements advocating the growth of and official status for Devanagari were established in Northern India. Babu Shiva Prasad and Madan Mohan Malaviya were notable early proponents of this movement. This, consequently, led to the development of Urdu movements defending Urdu's official status; Sir Syed Ahmed Khan was one of its noted advocates.

In 1900, the government issued a decree granting symbolic equal status to both Hindi and Urdu. Hindi and Urdu started to diverge linguistically, with Hindi drawing on Sanskrit as the primary source for formal and academic vocabulary, often with a conscious attempt to purge the language of Persian-derived equivalents. Deploring this Hindu-Muslim divide, Gandhi proposed re-merging the standards, using either Devanagari or Urdu script, under the traditional generic term Hindustani. Bolstered by the support of the Indian National Congress and various leaders involved in the Indian Independence Movement, Hindi, in the Devanagari script, along with English, replaced Urdu as one of the official languages of India during the institution of the Indian constitution in 1950.

Background 

Hindustani was the native language spoken in northern India (what is historically known as the region of Hindustan), and it belongs to the Western Hindi language class of Central Indo-Aryan languages. Mughal rulers brought with them to India the Persian language. In cities such as Delhi, Hindustani began to acquire some Persian loanwords and continued to be called "Hindi" as well as "Urdu". While Urdu retained the grammar and core vocabulary of the local Delhi dialect, it adopted the Nastaleeq writing system.

Urdu, like Hindi, is a form of the same language, Hindustani. It evolved from the medieval (6th to 13th century) Apabhraṃśa register of the preceding Shauraseni language, a Middle Indo-Aryan language that is also the ancestor of other modern Indo-Aryan languages. Around 75% of Urdu words have their etymological roots in Sanskrit and Prakrit, and approximately 99% of Urdu verbs have their roots in Sanskrit and Prakrit. The remaining 25% of Urdu's vocabulary consists of loanwords from Persian and Arabic.

The conflict over language reflected the larger politicization of culture and religion in nineteenth century colonial India, when religious identities were utilized in administration in unprecedented ways. In time, Hindustani written in Perso-Arabic script also became a literary language with an increasing body of literature written in the 18th and 19th century. A division developed gradually between Hindus, who chose to write Hindustani in Devanagari script, and Muslims and some Hindus who chose to write the same in Urdu script. The development of Hindi movements in the late nineteenth century further contributed to this divergence. Sumit Sarkar notes that in the 18th and the bulk of the 19th century, "Urdu had been the language of polite culture over a big part of north India, for Hindus quite as much as Muslims". For the decade of 1881-90, Sarkar gives figures which showed that the circulation of Urdu newspapers was twice that of Hindi newspapers and there were 55% more Urdu books as Hindi books. He gives the example of the author Premchand who wrote mainly in Urdu till 1915, until he found it difficult to publish in the language.

Professor Paul R. Brass notes in his book, Language, Religion and Politics in North India,

Controversy

British language policy 

In 1837, the British East India company replaced Persian with local vernacular in various provinces as the official language of government offices and of the lower courts. However, in the northern regions of the Indian subcontinent, Urdu in Urdu script was chosen as the replacement for Persian, rather than Hindi in the Devanagari script. The most immediate reason for the controversy is believed to be the contradictory language policy in North India in the 1860s. Although the then government encouraged both Hindi and Urdu as a medium of education in school, it discouraged Hindi or Nagari script for official purposes. This policy gave rise to conflict between students educated in Hindi or Urdu for the competition of government jobs, which eventually took on a communal form.

Hindi and Urdu movements 

In 1867, some Hindus in the United Provinces of Agra and Oudh during the British Raj in India began to demand that Hindi be made an official language in place of Urdu.  Babu Shiva Prasad of Banares was one of the early proponents of the Nagari script. In a Memorandum on court characters written in 1868, he accused the early Muslim rulers of India for forcing them to learn Persian. In 1897, Madan Mohan Malaviya published a collection of documents and statements titled Court character and primary education in North Western Provinces and Oudh, in which he made a compelling case for Hindi.

Several Hindi movements were formed in the late 19th and early 20th century; notable among them were Nagari Pracharini Sabha formed in Banaras in 1893, Hindi Sahitya Sammelan in Allahabad in 1910, Dakshina Bharat Hindi Prachar Sabha in 1918 and Rashtra Bhasha Prachar Samiti in 1926. The movement was encouraged in 1881 when Hindi in Devanagari script replaced Urdu in Persian script as the official language in neighboring Bihar. They submitted 118 memorials signed by 67,000 people to the Education Commission in several cities. The proponents of Hindi argued that the majority of people spoke Hindi and therefore introduction of Nagari script would provide better education and improve prospects for holding Government positions. They also argued that Urdu script made court documents illegible, encouraged forgery and promoted the use of complex Arabic and Persian words.

Organisations such as Anjuman Taraqqi-e-Urdu were formed in defence of the official status given to Urdu. Advocates of Urdu argued that Hindi scripts could not be written faster, and lacked standardisation and vocabulary. They also argued that the Urdu language originated in India, asserted that Urdu could also be spoken fluently by most of the people and disputed the assertion that official status of language and script is essential for the spread of education.

Communal violence broke out as the issue was taken up by firebrands. Sir Syed Ahmad Khan had once stated, "I look to both Hindus and Muslims with the same eyes & consider them as two eyes of a bride. By the word nation I only mean Hindus and Muslims and nothing else. We Hindus and Muslims live together under the same soil under the same government. Our interest and problems are common and therefore I consider the two factions as one nation." Speaking to Mr. Shakespeare, the governor of Banaras, after the language controversy heated up, he said "I am now convinced that the Hindus and Muslims could never become one nation as their religion and way of life was quite distinct from one another."

In the last three decades of the 19th century the controversy flared up several times in North-Western provinces and Oudh. The Hunter commission, appointed by the Government of India to review the progress of education, was used by the advocates of both Hindi and Urdu for their respective causes.

Gandhi's idea of Hindustani 
Hindi and Urdu continued to diverge both linguistically and culturally. Linguistically, Hindi continued drawing words from Sanskrit, and Urdu from Persian, Arabic and Chagatai. Culturally Urdu came to be identified with Muslims and Hindi with Hindus.  This wide divergence in the 1920s was deplored by Gandhi, who exhorted the re-merging of both Hindi and Urdu, naming it Hindustani, written in both Nagari and Persian scripts.  Though he failed in his attempt to bring together Hindi and Urdu under the Hindustani banner, he popularised Hindustani in other non-Hindustani speaking areas.

Muslim nationalism 

It has been argued that the Hindi–Urdu controversy sowed the seeds for Muslim nationalism in India. Some also argued that Syed Ahmad had expressed separatist views long before the controversy developed.

Linguistic purism 

Because of linguistic purism and its orientation towards the pre-Islamic past, advocates for pure Hindi have sought to remove many Persian, Arabic, and Turkic loanwords and replaced them with borrowings from Sanskrit. Conversely, formal Urdu employs far more Perso-Arabic words than does vernacular Hindustani.

Urdu to Hindi 
In April 1900, the colonial Government of the North-Western Provinces issued an order granting equal official status to both Nagari and Perso-Arabic scripts. This decree evoked protests from Urdu supporters and joy from Hindi supporters. However, the order was more symbolic in that it did not provision exclusive use of Nagari script. Perso-Arabic remained dominant in North-Western provinces and Oudh as the preferred writing system until independence.

C. Rajagopalachari, chief minister of Madras Presidency (where a majority of the population would have spoken Tamil or other Dravidian languages) introduced Hindi as a compulsory language in secondary school education though he later relented and opposed the introduction of Hindi during the Madras anti-Hindi agitation of 1965. Bal Gangadhar Tilak supported Devanagari script as the essential part of nationalist movement. The language policy of Congress and the independence movement paved its status as an alternative official language of independent India. Hindi was supported by religious and political leaders, social reformers, writers and intellectuals during independence movement securing that status. Hindi, along with English, was recognised as the official language of India during the institution of the Indian constitution in 1950.

See also 
 Urdu movement
 Hindi in Pakistan
 Linguistic purism
 History of Hindustani
 Persian and Urdu

References

External links 
South Asia Analysis Group: Hindi-Urdu controversy
A century of dedicated service: Anjuman Tarraqqi-i-Urdu, from Dawn 
Newspaper
 The poisonous potency of script: Hindi and Urdu ROBERT D. KING

Pakistan Movement
Hindustani language
Hindi
Urdu
Politics of British India
India–Pakistan relations
Political controversies
1867 in India
Language conflict in India
Linguistic controversies
Muslim politics in India
Urdu-language literary movements